Sar Rud (also Romanized as Sar Rūd) is a village in Zavin Rural District, Zavin District, Kalat County, Razavi Khorasan Province, Iran. At the 2006 census, its population was 849, in 207 families.

References 

Populated places in Kalat County